At least two ships of the French Navy have borne the name Linois:

 , an unprotected cruiser launched in 1867 and stricken in 1891
 , a  launched in 1894 and stricken in 1910

French Navy ship names